Homochirality is a uniformity of chirality, or handedness. Objects are chiral when they cannot be superposed on their mirror images. For example, the left and right hands of a human are approximately mirror images of each other but are not their own mirror images, so they are chiral. In biology, 19 of the 20 natural amino acids are homochiral, being L-chiral (left-handed), while sugars are D-chiral (right-handed). Homochirality can also refer to enantiopure substances in which all the constituents are the same enantiomer (a right-handed or left-handed version of an atom or molecule), but some sources discourage this use of the term.

It is unclear whether homochirality has a purpose; however, it appears to be a form of information storage. One suggestion is that it reduces entropy barriers in the formation of large organized molecules. It has been experimentally verified that amino acids form large aggregates in larger abundance from an enantiopure samples of the amino acid than from racemic (enantiomerically mixed) ones.

It is not clear whether homochirality emerged before or after life, and many mechanisms for its origin have been proposed. Some of these models propose three distinct steps: mirror-symmetry breaking creates a minute enantiomeric imbalance, chiral amplification builds on this imbalance, and chiral transmission is the transfer of chirality from one set of molecules to another.

In biology

Amino acids are the building blocks of peptides and enzymes while sugar-peptide chains are the backbone of RNA and DNA. In biological organisms, amino acids appear almost exclusively in the left-handed form (L-amino acids) and sugars in the right-handed form (R-sugars). Since the enzymes catalyze reactions, they enforce homochirality on a great variety of other chemicals, including hormones, toxins, fragrances and food flavors. Glycine is achiral, as are some other non-proteinogenic amino acids that are either achiral (such as dimethylglycine) or of the D enantiomeric form.

Biological organisms easily discriminate between molecules with different chiralities. This can affect physiological reactions such as smell and taste. Carvone, a terpenoid found in essential oils, smells like mint in its L-form and caraway in its R-form. Limonene tastes like citrics when right-handed and pine when left-handed.

Homochirality also affects the response to drugs. Thalidomide, in its left-handed form, cures morning sickness; in its right-handed form, it causes birth defects. Unfortunately, even if a pure left-handed version is administered, some of it can convert to the right-handed form in the patient. Many drugs are available as both a racemic mixture (equal amounts of both chiralities) and an enantiopure drug (only one chirality). Depending on the manufacturing process, enantiopure forms can be more expensive to produce than stereochemical mixtures.

Chiral preferences can also be found at a macroscopic level. Snail shells can be right-turning or left-turning helices, but one  form or the other is strongly preferred in a given species. In the edible snail Helix pomatia, only one out of 20,000 is left-helical. The coiling of plants can have a preferred chirality and even the chewing motion of cows has a 10% excess in one direction.

Origins

Symmetry breaking
Theories for the origin of homochirality in the molecules of life can be classified as deterministic or based on chance depending on their proposed mechanism. If there is a relationship between cause and effect — that is, a specific chiral field or influence causing the mirror symmetry breaking — the theory is classified as deterministic; otherwise it is classified as a theory based on chance (in the sense of randomness) mechanisms.

Another classification for the different theories of the origin of biological homochirality could be made depending on whether life emerged before the enantiodiscrimination step (biotic theories) or afterwards (abiotic theories). Biotic theories claim that homochirality is simply a result of the natural autoamplification process of life—that either the formation of life as preferring one chirality or the other was a chance rare event which happened to occur with the chiralities we observe, or that all chiralities of life emerged rapidly but due to catastrophic events and strong competition, the other unobserved chiral preferences were wiped out by the preponderance and metabolic, enantiomeric enrichment from the 'winning' chirality choices. If this was the case, remains of the extinct chirality sign should be found. Since this is not the case, nowadays biotic theories are no longer supported.

The emergence of chirality consensus as a natural autoamplification process has also been associated with the 2nd law of thermodynamics.

Deterministic theories 
Deterministic theories can be divided into two subgroups: if the initial chiral influence took place in a specific space or time location (averaging zero over large enough areas of observation or periods of time), the theory is classified as local deterministic; if the chiral influence is permanent at the time the chiral selection occurred, then it is classified as universal deterministic. The classification groups for local determinist theories and theories based on chance mechanisms can overlap. Even if an external chiral influence produced the initial chiral imbalance in a deterministic way, the outcome sign could be random since the external chiral influence has its enantiomeric counterpart elsewhere.

In deterministic theories, the enantiomeric imbalance is created due to an external chiral field or influence, and the ultimate sign imprinted in biomolecules will be due to it. Deterministic mechanisms for the production of non-racemic mixtures from racemic starting materials include: asymmetric physical laws, such as the electroweak interaction (via cosmic rays) or asymmetric environments, such as those caused by circularly polarized light, quartz crystals, or the Earth's rotation, β-Radiolysis or the magnetochiral effect. The most accepted universal deterministic theory is the electroweak interaction. Once established, chirality would be selected for.

One supposition is that the discovery of an enantiomeric imbalance in molecules in the Murchison meteorite supports an extraterrestrial origin of homochirality: there is evidence for the existence of circularly polarized light originating from Mie scattering on aligned interstellar dust particles which may trigger the formation of an enantiomeric excess within chiral material in space. Interstellar and near-stellar magnetic fields can align dust particles in this fashion. Another speculation (the Vester-Ulbricht hypothesis) suggests that fundamental chirality of physical processes such as that of the beta decay (see Parity violation) leads to slightly different half-lives of biologically relevant molecules.

Chance theories 
Chance theories are based on the assumption that "Absolute asymmetric synthesis, i.e., the formation of enantiomerically enriched products from achiral precursors without the intervention of chiral chemical reagents or catalysts, is in practice unavoidable on statistical grounds alone".

Consider the racemic state as a macroscopic property described by a binomial distribution; the experiment of tossing a coin, where the two possible outcomes are the two enantiomers is a good analogy. The discrete probability distribution  of obtaining n successes out of  Bernoulli trials, where the result of each Bernoulli trial occurs with probability  and the opposite occurs with probability  is given by:

 .

 .

As in the experiment of tossing a coin, in this case, we assume both events ( or ) to be equiprobable, . The probability of having exactly the same amount of both enantiomers is inversely proportional to the square root of the total number of molecules . For one mol of a racemic compound,  molecules, this probability becomes . The probability of finding the racemic state is so small that we can consider it negligible.

In this scenario, there is a need to amplify the initial stochastic enantiomeric excess through any efficient mechanism of amplification. The most likely path for this amplification step is by asymmetric autocatalysis. An autocatalytic chemical reaction is that in which the reaction product is itself a reactive, in other words, a chemical reaction is autocatalytic if the reaction product is itself the catalyst of the reaction. In asymmetric autocatalysis, the catalyst is a chiral molecule, which means that a chiral molecule is catalysing its own production. An initial enantiomeric excess, such as can be produced by polarized light, then allows the more abundant enantiomer to outcompete the other.

Amplification

Theory

In 1953, Charles Frank proposed a model to demonstrate that homochirality is a consequence of autocatalysis. In his model the L and D enantiomers of a chiral molecule are autocatalytically produced from an achiral molecule A

while suppressing each other through a reaction that he called mutual antagonism

In this model the racemic state is unstable in the sense that the slightest enantiomeric excess will be amplified to a completely homochiral state. This can be shown by computing the reaction rates from the law of mass action:

where  is the rate constant for the autocatalytic reactions,  is the rate constant for mutual antagonism reaction, and the concentration of A is kept constant for simplicity.

The analytical solutions for are found to be  . The ratio  increases at a more than exponential rate if  is positive (and vice versa). Every starting conditions different to

By defining the enantiomeric excess  as

we can compute the rate of change of enantiomeric excess using chain rule from the rate of change of the concentrations of enantiomers L and D.

Linear stability analysis of this equation shows that the racemic state  is unstable. Starting from almost everywhere in the concentration space, the system evolves to a homochiral state.

It is generally understood that autocatalysis alone does not yield to homochirality, and the presence of the mutually antagonistic relationship between the two enantiomers is necessary for the instability of the racemic mixture. However, recent studies show that homochirality could be achieved from autocatalysis in the absence of the mutually antagonistic relationship, but the underlying mechanism for symmetry-breaking is different.

Experiments
There are several laboratory experiments that demonstrate how a small amount of one enantiomer at the start of a reaction can lead to a large excess of a single enantiomer as the product. For example, the Soai reaction is autocatalytic. If the reaction is started with some of one of the product enantiomers already present, the product acts as an enantioselective catalyst for production of more of that same enantiomer. The initial presence of just 0.2 equivalent one enantiomer can lead to up to 93% enantiomeric excess of the product.

Another study concerns the proline catalyzed aminoxylation of propionaldehyde by nitrosobenzene. In this system, a small enantiomeric excess of catalyst leads to a large enantiomeric excess of product.

Serine octamer clusters are also contenders. These clusters of 8 serine molecules appear in mass spectrometry with an unusual homochiral preference, however there is no evidence that such clusters exist under non-ionizing conditions and amino acid phase behavior is far more prebiotically relevant. The recent observation that partial sublimation of a 10% enantioenriched sample of leucine results in up to 82% enrichment in the sublimate shows that enantioenrichment of amino acids could occur in space. Partial sublimation processes can take place on the surface of meteors where large variations in temperature exist. This finding may have consequences for the development of the Mars Organic Detector scheduled for launch in 2013 which aims to recover trace amounts of amino acids from the Mars surface exactly by a sublimation technique.

A high asymmetric amplification of the enantiomeric excess of sugars are also present in the amino acid catalyzed asymmetric formation of carbohydrates

One classic study involves an experiment that takes place in the laboratory. When sodium chlorate is allowed to crystallize from water and the collected crystals examined in a polarimeter, each crystal turns out to be chiral and either the L form or the D form. In an ordinary experiment the amount of L crystals collected equals the amount of D crystals (corrected for statistical effects). However, when the sodium chlorate solution is stirred during the crystallization process the crystals are either exclusively L or exclusively D. In 32 consecutive crystallization experiments 14 experiments deliver D-crystals and 18 others L-crystals. The explanation for this symmetry breaking is unclear but is related to autocatalysis taking place in the nucleation process.

In a related experiment, a crystal suspension of a racemic amino acid derivative continuously stirred, results in a 100% crystal phase of one of the enantiomers because the enantiomeric pair is able to equilibrate in solution  (compare with dynamic kinetic resolution).

Transmission
Once a significant enantiomeric enrichment has been produced in a system, the transference of chirality through the entire system is customary. This last step is known as the chiral transmission step. Many strategies in asymmetric synthesis are built on chiral transmission. Especially important is the so-called organocatalysis of organic reactions by proline for example in Mannich reactions.

Some proposed models for the transmission of chiral asymmetry are polymerization, epimerization  or copolymerization.

Optical resolution in racemic amino acids
There exists no theory elucidating correlations among L-amino acids. If one takes, for example, alanine, which has a small methyl group, and phenylalanine, which has a larger benzyl group, a simple question is in what aspect, L-alanine resembles L-phenylalanine more than D-phenylalanine, and what kind of mechanism causes the selection of all L-amino acids, because it might be possible that alanine was L and phenylalanine was D.

It was reported in 2004 that excess racemic D,L-asparagine (Asn), which spontaneously forms crystals of either isomer during recrystallization, induces asymmetric resolution of a co-existing racemic amino acid such as arginine (Arg), aspartic acid (Asp), glutamine (Gln), histidine (His), leucine (Leu), methionine (Met), phenylalanine (Phe), serine (Ser), valine (Val), tyrosine (Tyr), and tryptophan (Trp). The enantiomeric excess  of these amino acids was correlated almost linearly with that of the inducer, i.e., Asn. When recrystallizations from a mixture of 12 D,L-amino acids (Ala, Asp, Arg, Glu, Gln, His, Leu, Met, Ser, Val, Phe, and Tyr) and excess D,L-Asn were made, all amino acids with the same configuration with Asn were preferentially co-crystallized. It was incidental whether the enrichment took place in L- or D-Asn, however, once the selection was made, the co-existing amino acid with the same configuration at the α-carbon was preferentially involved because of thermodynamic stability in the crystal formation. The maximal ee was reported to be 100%. Based on these results, it is proposed that a mixture of racemic amino acids causes spontaneous and effective optical resolution, even if asymmetric synthesis of a single amino acid does not occur without an aid of an optically active molecule.

This is the first study elucidating reasonably the formation of chirality from racemic amino acids with experimental evidences.

History of term
This term was introduced by Kelvin in 1904, the year that he published his Baltimore Lecture of 1884. Kelvin used the term homochirality as a relationship between two molecules, i.e. two molecules are homochiral if they have the same chirality. Recently, however, homochiral has been used in the same sense as enantiomerically pure. This is permitted in some journals (but not encouraged), its meaning changing into the preference of a process or system for a single optical isomer in a pair of isomers in these journals.

See also
 Chiral life concept - of artificially synthesizing chiral-mirror version of life
 CIP system
 Stereochemistry
 Pfeiffer Effect
 Unsolved problems in chemistry

References

Further reading

External links
Observations Support Homochirality Theory. Photonics TechnologyWorld November 1998.
Origins of Homochirality. Conference in Nordita Stockholm, February 2008.

Biochemistry
Origin of life
Stereochemistry
 
Pharmacology